Cae Gwyn Site of Special Scientific Interest is a small heath and ponds at the northern end of the Isle of Anglesey.

The site has two distinct pond areas separated by a heathy ridge and is particularly notable for the  abundance of royal fern Osmunda regalis, bog sedge Carex limosa and especially for the populations of locally uncommon cranberry Vaccinium oxycoccos growing on a Sphagnum lawn in one of the ponds.

References

1980 establishments in Wales
Mechell, Anglesey
Nature reserves in Anglesey
Protected areas established in 1980
Sites of Special Scientific Interest on Anglesey